Bahruz Teymurov (born on 1 January 1994) is an Azerbaijani professional footballer who plays as a winger for Shamakhi in the Azerbaijan Premier League.

Club career
On 1 February 2015, Teymurov made his debut in the Azerbaijan Premier League for Khazar Lankaran match against Simurq.

References

External links
 

1994 births
Living people
Association football midfielders
Azerbaijani footballers
Azerbaijan Premier League players
FK Karvan players
Khazar Lankaran FK players
FK Shamkir players
MOIK Baku players
Kapaz PFK players
Shamakhi FK players